John Throop (September 11, 1733 – January 25, 1802) was a political and military leader of the Vermont Republic and the state of Vermont. Among the offices he held, Throop served as a justice of the Vermont Supreme Court from 1778 to 1780.

Early life
John Throop was born in North Woodstock, Colony of Connecticut, on September 11, 1733, the son of Rev. Amos Throop and Frances (Davis) Throop.  He was educated in Woodstock and in the early 1770s Throop relocated to Pomfret, Vermont.

Military service
Throop commanded a company of militia with the rank of captain, and took part in the American Revolution, including several scouting parties and patrols dispatched to provide early warning if British Army soldiers attacked Vermont from Canada.

Political career
After becoming a resident of Pomfret, Throop held several offices, to include: justice of the peace (beginning in 1773); town clerk (1778-1789); delegate to the 1777 constitutional convention; member of the Vermont House of Representatives (1778, 1787-1788); member of the Governor's Council (1779-1786); justice of the Vermont Supreme Court (1778-1780); judge of the Vermont Court of Confiscation which seized and resold the property of Tories (1779); and probate judge for Windsor County (1783-1792).

Death
Throop died in Pomfret on January 25, 1802.

Family
On December 17, 1755 he married Frances Dana (1735-1813), known as Fanny.  They were the parents of four sons: Nathaniel, Benjamin, Samuel, and John Winchester.

References

Sources

Books

Magazines

1733 births
1802 deaths
People from Woodstock, Connecticut
People from Windsor County, Vermont
People of pre-statehood Vermont
People of Vermont in the American Revolution
Members of the Vermont House of Representatives
Vermont state court judges
Justices of the Vermont Supreme Court